Knowledge management (KM) is the collection of methods relating to creating, sharing, using and managing the knowledge and information of an organization. It refers to a multidisciplinary approach to achieve organizational objectives by making the best use of knowledge.

An established discipline since 1991, KM includes courses taught in the fields of business administration, information systems, management, library, and information science. Other fields may contribute to KM research, including information and media, computer science, public health and public policy. Several universities offer dedicated master's degrees in knowledge management.

Many large companies, public institutions, and non-profit organisations have resources dedicated to internal KM efforts, often as a part of their business strategy, IT, or human resource management departments. Several consulting companies provide advice regarding KM to these organizations.

Knowledge management efforts typically focus on organisational objectives such as improved performance, competitive advantage, innovation, the sharing of lessons learned, integration, and continuous improvement of the organisation. These efforts overlap with organisational learning and may be distinguished from that by a greater focus on the management of knowledge as a strategic asset and on encouraging the sharing of knowledge. KM is an enabler of organizational learning.

The most complex scenario for knowledge management may be found in the context of supply chain as it involves multiple companies without an ownership relationship or hierarchy between them, being called by some authors as transorganizational or interorganizational knowledge. That complexity is additionally increased by industry 4.0 (or 4th industrial revolution) and digital transformation, as new challenges emerge from both the volume and speed of information flows and knowledge generation.

History
Knowledge management efforts have a long history, including on-the-job discussions, formal apprenticeship, discussion forums, corporate libraries, professional training, and mentoring programs. With increased use of computers in the second half of the 20th century, specific adaptations of technologies such as knowledge bases, expert systems, information repositories, group decision support systems, intranets, and computer-supported cooperative work have been introduced to further enhance such efforts.

In 1999, the term personal knowledge management was introduced; it refers to the management of knowledge at the individual level.

In the enterprise, early collections of case studies recognised the importance of knowledge management dimensions of strategy, process and measurement. Key lessons learned include people and the cultural norms which influence their behaviors are the most critical resources for successful knowledge creation, dissemination and application; cognitive, social and organisational learning processes are essential to the success of a knowledge management strategy; and measurement, benchmarking and incentives are essential to accelerate the learning process and to drive cultural change. In short, knowledge management programs can yield impressive benefits to individuals and organisations if they are purposeful, concrete and action-orientated.

Research
KM emerged as a scientific discipline in the early 1990s. It was initially supported by individual practitioners, when Skandia hired Leif Edvinsson of Sweden as the world's first Chief Knowledge Officer (CKO). Hubert Saint-Onge (formerly of CIBC, Canada), started investigating KM long before that. The objective of CKOs is to manage and maximise the intangible assets of their organizations. Gradually, CKOs became interested in practical and theoretical aspects of KM, and the new research field was formed. The KM idea has been taken up by academics, such as Ikujiro Nonaka (Hitotsubashi University), Hirotaka Takeuchi (Hitotsubashi University), Thomas H. Davenport (Babson College) and Baruch Lev (New York University).

In 2001, Thomas A. Stewart, former editor at Fortune magazine and subsequently the editor of Harvard Business Review, published a cover story highlighting the importance of intellectual capital in organizations. The KM discipline has been gradually moving towards academic maturity. First, is a trend toward higher cooperation among academics; single-author publications are less common. Second, the role of practitioners has changed. Their contribution to academic research declined from 30% of overall contributions up to 2002, to only 10% by 2009. Third, the number of academic knowledge management journals has been steadily growing, currently reaching 27 outlets.

Multiple KM disciplines exist; approaches vary by author and school. As the discipline matured, academic debates increased regarding theory and practice, including:
 Techno-centric with a focus on technology, ideally those that enhance knowledge sharing and creation.
 Organisational with a focus on how an organisation can be designed to facilitate knowledge processes best.
 Ecological with a focus on the interaction of people, identity, knowledge, and environmental factors as a complex adaptive system akin to a natural ecosystem.

Regardless of the school of thought, core components of KM roughly include people/culture, processes/structure and technology.  The details depend on the  perspective. KM perspectives include:
 community of practice
 social network analysis 
 intellectual capital
 information theory
 complexity science
 constructivism
The practical relevance of academic research in KM has been questioned with action research suggested as having more relevance and the need to translate the findings presented in academic journals to a practice.

Dimensions
Different frameworks for distinguishing between different 'types of' knowledge exist. One proposed framework for categorising the dimensions of knowledge distinguishes tacit knowledge and explicit knowledge. Tacit knowledge represents internalised knowledge that an individual may not be consciously aware of, such as to accomplish particular tasks. At the opposite end of the spectrum, explicit knowledge represents knowledge that the individual holds consciously in mental focus, in a form that can easily be communicated to others.

Ikujiro Nonaka proposed a model (SECI, for Socialisation, Externalisation, Combination, Internalisation) which considers a spiraling interaction between explicit knowledge and tacit knowledge. In this model, knowledge follows a cycle in which implicit knowledge is 'extracted' to become explicit knowledge, and explicit knowledge is 're-internalised' into implicit knowledge.

Hayes and Walsham (2003) describe knowledge and knowledge management as two different perspectives. The content perspective suggests that knowledge is easily stored; because it may be codified, while the relational perspective recognises the contextual and relational aspects of knowledge which can make knowledge difficult to share outside the specific context in which it is developed.

Early research suggested that KM needs to convert internalised tacit knowledge into explicit knowledge to share it, and the same effort must permit individuals to internalise and make personally meaningful any codified knowledge retrieved from the KM effort.

Subsequent research suggested that a distinction between tacit knowledge and explicit knowledge represented an oversimplification and that the notion of explicit knowledge is self-contradictory. Specifically, for knowledge to be made explicit, it must be translated into information (i.e., symbols outside our heads).  More recently, together with Georg von Krogh and Sven Voelpel, Nonaka returned to his earlier work in an attempt to move the debate about knowledge conversion forward.

A second proposed framework for categorising knowledge dimensions distinguishes embedded knowledge of a system outside a human individual (e.g., an information system may have knowledge embedded into its design) from embodied knowledge representing a learned capability of a human body's nervous and endocrine systems.

A third proposed framework distinguishes between the exploratory creation of "new knowledge" (i.e., innovation) vs. the transfer or exploitation of "established knowledge" within a group, organisation, or community. Collaborative environments such as communities of practice or the use of social computing tools can be used for both knowledge creation and transfer.

Strategies
Knowledge may be accessed at three stages: before, during, or after KM-related activities. Organisations have tried knowledge capture incentives, including making content submission mandatory and incorporating rewards into performance measurement plans. Considerable controversy exists over whether such incentives work and no consensus has emerged.

One strategy to KM involves actively managing knowledge (push strategy). In such an instance, individuals strive to explicitly encode their knowledge into a shared knowledge repository, such as a database, as well as retrieving knowledge they need that other individuals have provided (codification). Another strategy involves individuals making knowledge requests of experts associated with a particular subject on an ad hoc basis (pull strategy). In such an instance, expert individual(s) provide insights to requestor (personalisation). When talking about strategic knowledge management, the form of the knowledge and activities to share it defines the concept between codification and personalization.  The form of the knowledge means that it’s either tacit or explicit. Data and information can be considered as explicit and know-how can be considered as tacit. 

Hansen et al. defined the two strategies (codification and personalisation). Codification means a system-oriented method in KM strategy for managing explicit knowledge with organizational objectives. Codification strategy is document-centered strategy, where knowledge is mainly codified as “people-to-document” method. Codification relies on information infrastructure, where explicit knowledge is carefully codified and stored. Codification focuses on collecting and storing codified knowledge in electronic databases to make it accessible. Codification can therefore refer to both tacit and explicit knowledge. In contrast, personalisation encourages individuals to share their knowledge directly. Personification means human-oriented KM strategy where the target is to improve knowledge flows through networking and integrations related to tacit knowledge with knowledge sharing and creation. Information technology plays a less important role, as it only facilitates communication and knowledge sharing.

Other knowledge management strategies and instruments for companies include:
 Knowledge sharing (fostering a culture that encourages the sharing of information, based on the concept that knowledge is not irrevocable and should be shared and updated to remain relevant)
 Make knowledge-sharing a key role in employees' job description
 Inter-project knowledge transfer
 Intra-organisational knowledge sharing
 Inter-organisational knowledge sharing
 Knowledge retention also known as Knowledge Continuation: activities addressing the challenge of knowledge loss as a result of people leaving
 Mapping knowledge competencies, roles and identifying current or future predicted gaps.
 Defining for each chosen role the main knowledge that should be retained, and building rituals in which the knowledge is documented or transferred on, from the day they start their job.
 Transfer of knowledge and information prior to employee departure by means of sharing documents, shadowing, mentoring, and more,
 Proximity & architecture (the physical situation of employees can be either conducive or obstructive to knowledge sharing)
 Storytelling (as a means of transferring tacit knowledge)
 Cross-project learning
 After-action reviews
 Knowledge mapping requires the organization to know what kind of knowledge organization has and how is it distributed throughout the company, and how to efficiently use and re-use that knowledge. (a map of knowledge repositories within a company accessible by all)
 Communities of practice
 Expert directories (to enable knowledge seeker to reach to the experts)
 Expert systems (knowledge seeker responds to one or more specific questions to reach knowledge in a repository)
 Best practice transfer
 Knowledge fairs
 Competency-based management (systematic evaluation and planning of knowledge related competences of individual organisation members)
 Master–apprentice relationship, Mentor-mentee relationship, job shadowing
 Collaborative software technologies (wikis, shared bookmarking, blogs, social software, etc.)
 Knowledge repositories (databases, bookmarking engines, etc.)
 Measuring and reporting intellectual capital (a way of making explicit knowledge for companies)
 Knowledge brokers (some organisational members take on responsibility for a specific "field" and act as first reference on a specific subject)
 Knowledge farming (using note-taking software to cultivate a knowledge graph, part of knowledge agriculture)
 Knowledge capturing (refers to a process where trained people extract valuable or else desired knowledge from experts and embed it in databases)

Motivations
Multiple motivations lead organisations to undertake KM. Typical considerations include:
 Making available increased knowledge content in the development and provision of products and services
 Achieving shorter development cycles
 Improving consistency of knowledge and standardized expert skills among staff
 Facilitating and managing innovation and organisational learning
 Leveraging expertises across the organisation
 Increasing network connectivity between internal and external individuals
 Managing business environments and allowing employees to obtain relevant insights and ideas appropriate to their work
 Solving intractable or wicked problems
 Managing intellectual capital and assets in the workforce (such as the expertise and know-how possessed by key individuals or stored in repositories)

KM technologies
Knowledge management (KM) technology can be categorised:
 Collaborative software(Groupware)—Software that facilitates collaboration and sharing of organisational information. Such applications provide tools for threaded discussions, document sharing, organisation-wide uniform email, and other collaboration-related features.
 Workflow systems—Systems that allow the representation of processes associated with the creation, use and maintenance of organisational knowledge, such as the process to create and utilise forms and documents.
 Content management and document management systems—Software systems that automate the process of creating web content and/or documents. Roles such as editors, graphic designers, writers and producers can be explicitly modeled along with the tasks in the process and validation criteria. Commercial vendors started either to support documents or to support web content but as the Internet grew these functions merged and vendors now perform both functions.
 Enterprise portals—Software that aggregates information across the entire organisation or for groups such as project teams.
 eLearning—Software that enables organisations to create customised training and education. This can include lesson plans, monitoring progress and online classes.
 Planning and scheduling software—Software that automates schedule creation and maintenance. The planning aspect can integrate with project management software.
 Telepresence—Software that enables individuals to have virtual "face-to-face" meetings without assembling at one location. Videoconferencing is the most obvious example.
 Semantic technology such as ontologies—Systems that encode meaning alongside data to give machines the ability to extract and infer information.

These categories overlap. Workflow, for example, is a significant aspect of a content or document management systems, most of which have tools for developing enterprise portals. 
 
Proprietary KM technology products such as Lotus Notes defined proprietary formats for email, documents, forms, etc. The Internet drove most vendors to adopt Internet formats. Open-source and freeware tools for the creation of blogs and wikis now enable capabilities that used to require expensive commercial tools.

KM is driving the adoption of tools that enable organisations to work at the semantic level, as part of the Semantic Web. Some commentators have argued that after many years the Semantic Web has failed to see widespread adoption, while other commentators have argued that it has been a success.

Knowledge barriers 
Just like knowledge transfer and knowledge sharing, the term "knowledge barriers" is not a uniformly defined term and differs in its meaning depending on the author. Knowledge barriers can be associated with high costs for both companies and individuals.

Knowledge retention 
Knowledge retention is part of knowledge management. It helps convert tacit form of knowledge into an explicit form. It is a complex process which aims to reduce the knowledge loss in the organization.  Knowledge retention is needed when expert knowledge workers leave the organization after a long career.  Retaining knowledge prevents losing intellectual capital.  

According to DeLong(2004)  knowledge retention strategies are divided into four main categories:
 Human resources, processes and practices
 Knowledge transfer practices
 Knowledge recovery practices
 Information technologies used to capture, store and share knowledge.

Knowledge retention projects are usually introduced in three stages: decision making, planning and implementation. There are differences among researchers on the terms of the stages. For example, Dalkir talks about knowledge capture, sharing and acquisition and Doan et al. introduces initiation, implementation and evaluation.  Furthermore, Levy introduces three steps (scope, transfer, integration) but also recognizes a “zero stage” for initiation of the project.

See also

Archives management
Customer knowledge
Dynamic knowledge repository
Electronic Journal of Knowledge Management
Ignorance management
Information governance
Information management
Journal of Knowledge Management
Journal of Knowledge Management Practice
Knowledge cafe
Knowledge community
Knowledge ecosystem
Knowledge engineering
Knowledge management software
Knowledge modeling
Knowledge transfer
Knowledge translation
Legal case management
Personal knowledge management

References

External links 

 

 
Management cybernetics
Information systems
Business terms
Hypertext